Eulophota caustella is a species of snout moth in the genus Eulophota. It was described by George Hampson in 1901, and is known from South Africa.

References

Endemic moths of South Africa
Moths described in 1901
Phycitinae